The 1986 Athens Trophy was a women's tennis tournament played on outdoor clay courts in Athens, Greece that was part of the 1986 Virginia Slims World Championship Series. It was the inaugural edition of the tournament and was held from 15 September until 21 September 1986. Sylvia Hanika won the singles title.

Finals

Singles
 Sylvia Hanika defeated  Angelika Kanellopoulou 7–5, 6–1
 It was Hanika's only title of the year and the 3rd of her career.

Doubles
 Isabel Cueto /  Arantxa Sánchez defeated  Silke Meier /  Wiltrud Probst 4–6, 6–2, 6–4
 It was Cueto's only title of the year and the 1st of her career. It was Sánchez's only title of the year and the 1st of her career.

See also
 1986 Athens Open – men's tournament

1986 Virginia Slims World Championship Series
Athens Trophy
Athens Trophy